Antipater II (c. 46 – 4 BC) was Herod the Great's first-born son, his only child by his first wife Doris.  He was named after his paternal grandfather Antipater the Idumaean.  He and his mother were exiled after Herod divorced her between 43 BC and 40 BC to marry Mariamne I.  However, he was recalled following Mariamne's fall in 29 BC and in 13 BC Herod made him his first heir in his will.  He retained this position even when Alexander and Aristobulus (Herod's sons by Mariamne) rose in the royal succession in 12 BC, and even became exclusive successor to the throne after their execution in 7 BC (with Herod II in second place).

However, in 5 BC Antipater was brought before Publius Quinctilius Varus, then Roman governor of Syria, charged with the intended murder of his father Herod.  Antipater was found guilty by Varus; however, due to Antipater's high rank, it was necessary for Caesar Augustus to approve of the recommended sentence of death.  After the guilty verdict, Antipater's position as exclusive successor was removed and granted to Herod Antipas.  Once the sentence had approval from Augustus in 4 BC, Antipater was then executed, and Archelaus (from the marriage with Malthace) was made heir in his father's will as king over Herod's entire kingdom (with Antipas and Philip as Tetrarchs over certain territories).

Concerning Antipater's execution following on the heel of Herod's executions a couple of years before of his sons Alexander and Aristobulus, it would be recounted in the compendium Saturnalia (compiled by Macrobius) that Augustus remarked "It is better to be Herod's pig than his son."

We know two of Antipater's wives through the writings of Josephus.  First was his niece Mariamne III, daughter of Aristobulus IV.  The second was a high-ranking Hasmonean princess whose first name is lost to history.  She was the daughter of Antigonus the Hasmonean, the last Hasmonean king who also served as high priest.  This wife of Antipater was also a first cousin of Mariamne I, renowned royal wife of Herod the Great.  Josephus records that she was at the palace with Doris, Antipater's mother, in support of her husband during his trial before Varus in 5 BC.

In literature
In Robert Graves' King Jesus, Graves puts forth the idea that Antipater secretly married at the age of 15 Mary, who was of a royal Jewish line.  The marriage served to strengthen the position of Antipater among Herod's many sons as future King of the Jews. Antipater was killed by his father five days before Herod's own death according to Josephus. (Some records indicate a period of two years between Antipater's death and Herod the Great's death).  According to Graves, a pregnant Mary is compelled to pretend to marry an old, pious carpenter, Joseph, to protect herself and the unborn Jesus. Author Joseph Raymond supports this hypothesis as a fact. Unlike Graves, however, Raymond specifies that Mary was actually the unnamed daughter of Antigonus who would later become Antipater's wife.

References

Herodian dynasty
46 BC births
4 BC deaths
Herod the Great
1st-century BCE Jews
Heirs apparent who never acceded